Tangkhul Naga may refer to:
 Tangkhul Naga people (Tangkhul Nagas) - Tangkhul people
 Tangkhul Naga language - Tangkhul language